Colobonema sericeum is a species of deep-sea hydrozoan in the family Rhopalonematidae that was first described in 1902. This semi-transparent organism is found in the mesopelagic zone, has 32 tentacles, and has a bell diameter of up 45 mm. They are holoplanktonic and never attach to the seafloor as part of their polyp life cycle, but instead have embryos that develop directly into a small, swimming medusae.

References

Rhopalonematidae
Cnidarians of the Atlantic Ocean
Cnidarians of the Indian Ocean
Cnidarians of the Pacific Ocean
Animals described in 1902